The 1987 World Polo Championship was played in Buenos Aires Argentina during April 1987 and was won by Argentina. This event brought together five teams from around the world in the Campo Argentino de Polo.

Final Match 

In this first Championship all the teams played one game against each other.  In the game between Argentina and Mexico the score was tied at 14 all.  Argentina had won more games overall and therefore was the winner of the World Championship I and Mexico was second having won the next largest number of games in the tournament.

Final rankings

External links
 Federation of International Polo website

1987
Polo competitions in Argentina
Sports competitions in Buenos Aires
P
1987 in polo